The Poseidon Adventure may refer to:

The Poseidon Adventure (novel), an American adventure novel by Paul Gallico, published in 1969
Film adaptations of the novel:
The Poseidon Adventure (1972), directed by Ronald Neame
Beyond the Poseidon Adventure (1979), the sequel to the 1972 film, directed by  Irwin Allen 
The Poseidon Adventure (2005), directed by John Putch
Poseidon (2006), directed by Wolfgang Petersen

See also

 
 
 Poseidon (disambiguation)